Ibrahim Al-Hsawi (born November 6, 1964)  is a Saudi Arabian actor and poet. He acted in several series including Tash ma Tash.

Career 
Al-Hsawi started his acting career in 1980 in the Theater of Al-Adlah Club. He took some big roles onstage, and he participated in his first action TV role in 1989 in the show called Kaznah with Ali Al-Sebaa. He also starred in the famous serial Tash ma Tash.

Acting works

Series 
 Kaznah 1989
 Tash ma Tash
 Akoon Aw La (2012) MBC Production
 Al-Saknat Fe Klobna also MBC Production
  Magazif Al-Amal    
 Hartna Heloah

 Leila
 Bayni Wa Bynak 
 Ala Motha ogani.

Plays
Imru al-Qais
moat Al-mogani farag
Safi
 Moat Al-Molaf

Movies
 Ayash 

References

1964 births
Living people
Saudi Arabian male film actors
Saudi Arabian male stage actors
Saudi Arabian male television actors
20th-century Saudi Arabian poets
Saudi Arabian Shia Muslims
People from Al-Hasa
21st-century Saudi Arabian poets